Erwinna is an unincorporated community in Tinicum Township in Bucks County, Pennsylvania, United States. It has an area code of 610 and is located along the Delaware Canal State Park. Its zip code is 18920.

History
It is named after Colonel Arthur Erwin (also "Irwin"), who was a leader in the Bucks County Militia.  A concise biography of him has been created by the DAR Chapter bearing his name.  Colonel Erwin is said to have supplied many of the boats which were used by George Washington and the Continental Army to cross the Delaware en route to the Battle of Trenton on the morning of December 26, 1776.

The Erwinna Covered Bridge, Riverside Farm, Stover Mill, and Isaac Stover House are listed on the National Register of Historic Places.

There is also a two-story, one-room schoolhouse which was active from 1861–1957.

Notes

Unincorporated communities in Bucks County, Pennsylvania
Unincorporated communities in Pennsylvania